The Boise Junior College Administration Building is a historic college building on the campus of Boise State University in Boise, Idaho.  It was designed by the Boise architectural firms of Tourtellotte & Hummel and Wayland & Fennell, and placed on the National Register of Historic Places in 1982.

The Administration Building was built in 1940 to house nearly all of the functions of the newly established Boise Junior College.  It originally housed the schools library, classrooms, and administrative offices, although the former have since been moved to other, newer buildings on campus.

Like Tourtellotte's Administration Building at the University of Idaho, it is designed in a Tudor Revival style.

References

University and college buildings on the National Register of Historic Places in Idaho
Tudor Revival architecture in the United States
Buildings and structures completed in 1940
National Register of Historic Places in Ada County, Idaho